The Minnesota Vikings Cheerleaders are the official cheer squad for the Minnesota Vikings. The squad performs at every home game at the U.S. Bank Stadium, the home stadium of Minnesota. Before the squad's introduction in 1984, The Vi-Queens (1961–63) and the St. Louis Park High School Parkettes performed (1964-65, 67–83) Edina High School Hornettes and Minneapolis Roosevelt High School Rockettes in 1966. In 1984, the MVC were started.  The group currently has 35 members. The squad, like other groups in the league, releases a swimsuit calendar annually since 2001. The squad also makes off-field appearances at parades, schools, and charity events. Like other NFL cheerleading squads, the MVC also has a "Junior Minnesota Vikings Cheerleaders" program, which has various divisions: Junior Angel Division is for girls aged 3–5, and Junior Cheerleader Division is for girls aged 6–14. The MVC also helps mentor the Junior Cheerleaders by enriching their interests.  In April, the MVC hosts tryouts at Winter Park. From when the division was founded in 2002 to 2016, when the Detroit Lions Cheerleaders were re established, the Vikings were the only team in the NFC North with a cheerleading squad.

Gallery

References

External links

 Minnesota Vikings Cheerleaders official page
 MVC Facebook Page
 MVC Twitter Page

Minnesota Vikings
National Football League cheerleading squads
Women's sports in Minnesota